Hama District is a district (mantiqah) administratively belonging to Hama Governorate, Syria. At the time of the 2004 Census, it had a population of 644,445. Its administrative centre is the city of Hama.

Sub-districts
The district of Hama is divided into four sub-districts or nahiyahs (population according to 2004 official census):
Hama Subdistrict (ناحية حماة): population 467,254.
Suran Subdistrict (ناحية صوران): population 90,654.
Hirbnafsah Subdistrict (ناحية حربنفسه): population 54,592.
Al-Hamraa Subdistrict (ناحية الحمراء): population 32,604.

References

 

pt:Hama (distrito)